The 2014 Scottish Challenge Cup final, also known as the Ramsdens Cup final for sponsorship reasons, was a football match that took place at Easter Road on 6 April 2014, between Raith Rovers and Rangers. The match was televised by BBC ALBA. It was the 23rd final of the Scottish Challenge Cup since it was first organised in 1990 to celebrate the centenary of the now defunct Scottish Football League, it was the first Challenge Cup final since the formation of the SPFL. Both teams progressed through four elimination rounds to reach the final. The match was both clubs' first appearance in the final of the competition, whilst it was Raith Rovers' first cup final in 20 years since winning the League Cup in 1994.

Route to the final

The competition is a knock-out tournament and in 2013–14 was contested by 32 teams; the 30 clubs that played in the Championship, League One and League Two of the Scottish Professional Football League, Highland League club Formartine United by invitation (the highest placed team in that league from the previous season with an SFA licence) & the winner of a preliminary round tie between Spartans & Threave Rovers (the highest placed teams in the previous season's East of Scotland & South of Scotland leagues with SFA licences), the winner of the tie being Spartans. For the first and second rounds only, the draw was divided into two geographical regions – north/east and south/west. Teams were paired at random and the winner of each match progressed to the next round and the loser was eliminated.

Raith Rovers

Rangers

Match details

References

Scottish Challenge Cup Finals
Scottish Challenge Cup Final 2014
Scottish Challenge Cup Final 2014
Challenge Cup Final
3